Cape Anguille is a settlement in the south-west region of Newfoundland, Canada. It marks the south-western edge of the Anguille Mountains. The Cape Anguille Lighthouse is located in Cape Anguille.

The headland of Cape Anguille is the most western point of land of the island of Newfoundland.

References

External links
http://www.atl.ec.gc.ca/epb/sfish/maps/nf/high/f400106h.jpg

Populated coastal places in Canada
Populated places in Newfoundland and Labrador